|}

The Fairlawne Handicap Chase, currently run under the sponsored title of the Paddy Power New Year's Day Handicap Chase, is a Grade 3 National Hunt steeplechase in Great Britain which is open to horses aged five years or older. It is run on the New Course at Cheltenham over a distance of about 2 miles and 4½ furlongs (2 miles 4 furlongs and 127 yards, or 4,139 metres) and during its running there are 17 fences to be jumped. It is a handicap race, and is scheduled to take place each year on New Year's Day.

The race was first run in 1990 as the Cleeve Hill Handicap Chase and was awarded Grade 3 status in 2009.  

From 2014 the race became officially known as the Fairlawne Chase, a name previously associated with a three-mile conditions chase run at Windsor until 1997.

Winners

See also
 Horse racing in Great Britain
 List of British National Hunt races

References
Racing Post:

Cheltenham Racecourse
National Hunt chases
National Hunt races in Great Britain
Recurring sporting events established in 1990
1990 establishments in England